Pat Senatore (born August 19, 1935) is a jazz bassist born in Newark, New Jersey.

Biography
He attended the Juilliard School of Music in New York for two years but left because it did not offer jazz at that time.
He then toured the country with the Stan Kenton Orchestra and recorded Adventures in Blues, and Adventures In Jazz at Capitol Records.   He was the bassist for Herb Alpert and the Tijuana Brass from 1964–1968.  
Senatore produced CD's for Hi-Brite and Moo Records including: two volumes of the VIP Trio with Cedar Walton, Billy Higgins and himself; Pasquale, with himself, Billy Childs, Billy Higgins, Paul Hanson (bassoon), Pedro Eustache (flute), Mike Barone (trombone), featuring several of his original compositions.

Currently, Pat Senatore is the Artistic Director for Herb Alpert's Vibrato Grill Jazz in Bel Air, CA, where he performs regularly.

Selected discography

As a leader
 Pasquale (Moo, 1997)
 Ascensione (Fresh Sounds, 2008)

As sideman
 Stan Kenton:  1961–1964; Albums included Adventures in Standards Adventures in Blues, Adventures In Jazz on Capitol Records
 Herb Alpert and the Tijuana Brass: 1964–1968; Albums included South of the Border, SRO, Herb Alpert's Ninth, Christmas Album, all on the A&M Records label
 Cedar Walton:  1988–1991; Standard Album (Vol 2) on Hi Brite

References

External links

American jazz bass guitarists
American male bass guitarists
Living people
1935 births
Musicians from Newark, New Jersey
Guitarists from New Jersey
20th-century American bass guitarists
20th-century American male musicians
American male jazz musicians